Dillon Falls may refer to:
 Dillon Falls (Deschutes County, Oregon), on the Deschutes River
 Dillon Falls (Jackson County, Oregon), on the Rouge River
 Dillon Falls, Ohio, an unincorporated community